Wellington Park is the protected area which encompasses kunanyi / Mount Wellington and surrounds near Hobart, Tasmania. There are numerous hiking and mountain bike tracks within the park of varying difficulty.

Protection
Although it carries the same status as a national park (IUCN protected area category II), because the park contains private land it cannot technically be reserved as a national park.

Management
Wellington Park is administered by the Wellington Park Management Trust established in 1993 whose members include: Hobart and Glenorchy City Councils, Tasmania Parks and Wildlife Service, DPIPWE, TasWater and Tourism Tasmania. The Wellington Park Management Trust is outlined in the Wellington Park Act 1993.

Gallery

See also
Protected areas of Tasmania
Wellington Range

References

External links
Wellington Park website

1993 establishments in Australia
Protected areas established in 1993
Tourist attractions in Hobart
Mount Wellington (Tasmania)